Mary J. Carruthers (born January 15, 1941) is the Erich Maria Remarque Professor of Literature and Professor of English, emerita, at New York University. She also teaches at New York University Abu Dhabi. She is formerly a professor at Case Western Reserve University and the University of Illinois.

She has written widely on medieval literature and rhetoric, memory and mnemonic techniques, and the history of spirituality.

She holds a Ph.D. in English from Yale University (1965), and a B.A. in English from Wellesley College (1961).

She was elected fellow of the American Academy of Arts and Sciences in 2020.

Carruthers was elected to the American Philosophical Society in 2022.

Publications
Rhetoric Beyond Words: Delight and Persuasion in the Arts of the Middle Ages. ed. Cambridge: Cambridge University Press. 2010.
'Ars oblivionalis, ars inveniendi: The Cherub Figure and the Arts of Memory.' Gesta 48 (2009): 1–19.
'Varietas: a word of many colours.' Poetica: Zeitschrift für Sprach- und Literaturwissenschaft (Munich, Germany), Fall 2009: 33–54.
'Mechanisms for the transmission of culture: the role of 'place' in the arts of memory.' In Translatio, the Transmission of Culture in the Middle Ages. ed Laura Hollengreen. Arizona Studies in the Middle Ages and Renaissance (Turnhout: Brepols), 2008: 1–26.
'Sweetness.' Speculum 81 (2006): 999–1013.
'On affliction and reading, weeping and argument: Chaucer's lachrymose Troilus in context.' Representations 93 (2006): 1–21.
The Medieval Craft of Memory: An Anthology of Texts and Pictures. ed. with J. M. Ziolkowski. University of Pennsylvania Press. 2002.
The Craft of Thought: Meditation, Rhetoric. and the Making of Images. 400–1200. Cambridge: Cambridge University Press. 1998.
The Book of Memory: A Study of Memory in Medieval Culture. New York: Cambridge University Press. 1990. (Second Ed. Cambridge: Cambridge University Press. 2008.)
Acts of Interpretation: The Text in Its Contexts. 700–1600. ed. with Elizabeth D. Kirk. Norman, OK: Pilgrim Books. 1982.
The Search for St. Truth: A Study of Meaning in Piers Plowman. Evanston, IL: Northwestern University Press. 1973.
'The Wife of Bath and the Painting of Lions' (essay)

References

Sources
Mary Carruthers biography on the NYU website
Mary Carruthers curriculum vitae

1941 births
Living people
New York University faculty
Literature educators
American women academics
Academic staff of New York University Abu Dhabi
Fellows of All Souls College, Oxford
Fellows of the Medieval Academy of America
Fellows of the American Academy of Arts and Sciences
Corresponding Fellows of the British Academy
Members of the American Philosophical Society